The 1919–20 Quebec Athletics season was the Athletics' first and last season in the National Hockey League (NHL). The Quebec franchise, dating from the National Hockey Association (NHA), was re-activated after two seasons of dormancy. The team placed fourth and last in the league in both halves of the season to not qualify for the playoffs. The Quebec franchise would be transferred to Hamilton, Ontario, before the next season.

Off-season
The Quebec NHL franchise had been dormant for two seasons. In the first season, long-time manager Mike Quinn had retired due to ill health and the club's directors voted to suspend the team. Before the second season, the team had been sold to Percy Quinn (no relation), but Quinn was only using the franchise in an ill-fated attempt to resurrect the National Hockey Association (NHA). The NHL owners then cancelled the Quebec NHL franchise, leaving Quebec out of the league for a second season. In May 1919, Calder and Mike Quinn made efforts to return Quebec to the league. This led to the NHL approving a new franchise in December 1919, to be operated by the Quebec Athletic Club and the club's official name in the NHL was the Quebec Athletic Club, leaving the old 'Bulldogs' nickname behind. Mike Quinn returned to manage the team for the season.

Regular season
Joe Malone and Jack McDonald from the Quebec NHA team were 'returned' to the new Quebec NHL team. Malone would lead the league in scoring with 39 goals. Malone would score seven goals in a game against Toronto on January 31, 1920, and six goals in a game against Ottawa on March 10, 1920.

On March 3, the Montreal Canadiens pummeled the Athletics 16–3, setting an all-time NHL record for goals by one team.

Final standings

Record vs. opponents

Playoffs

The Athletics did not qualify for the playoffs.

Player stats

Awards and records
 Joe Malone - NHL scoring champion

Transactions
 Howie Lockhart - Loaned to Quebec by Toronto, March 6, 1920. (Toronto 11, Quebec 2).

References

 

Notes

See also
 1919–20 NHL season

Quebec Bulldogs season, 1919-20
Quebec